Events from the year 1995 in Pakistan.

Incumbents

Federal government
President: Farooq Leghari 
Prime Minister: Benazir Bhutto
Chief Justice: Sajjad Ali Shah

Governors
Governor of Balochistan – Imran Ullah Khan 
Governor of Khyber Pakhtunkhwa – Khurshid Ali Khan
Governor of Punjab – 
 until 22 May: Raja Saroop Khan
 22 May-19 June: Muhammad Ilyas
 starting 19 June: Raja Saroop Khan
Governor of Sindh – Mahmoud Haroon (until 21 May); Kamaluddin Azfar (starting 21 May)

Events 
  Pakistan invests in the private sector to boost power production.
 July – The Pakistani embassy in Kabul is attacked.
 December – A bomb blast targeting the Egyptian embassy in Islamabad kills 13.
 First Pakistan Auto Show

Births 

 5 January – Muhammad Tousiq, field hockey player
 2 February – Arfa Karim, student, world's youngest Microsoft Certified Professional (2004–2008) (died 2012)
 15 October – Diana Baig, female cricketer
 9 November – Sara Raza Khan, singer
 12 December – Sami Aslam, cricketer
 28 December – Mohammad Abubakar Durrani, canoeist

Full date unknown 
 Hamidullah Khan, bagram captive

Deaths
April 16 – Iqbal Masih, born 1983, children's right activist

See also
1994 in Pakistan
Other events of 1995
1996 in Pakistan
Timeline of Pakistani history

References

 
1995 in Asia